Helle Louise Klein (born 9 July 1966) is a Swedish journalist and political commentator.

Helle Klein was born in Enskede in southern Stockholm. She is the granddaughter of the physicist Oskar Klein and the great granddaughter of the rabbi Gottlieb Klein. Helle Klein served as political editor-in-chief of the newspaper Örebro-Kuriren from 1991 to 1995. In 1995, she started to work as an editorial writer for Aftonbladet, the largest newspaper in Sweden, where she was political editor-in-chief from 2001 to 2007. She was ordained priest in the Church of Sweden in January 2008.

Klein is a former member of the board of the Swedish Social Democratic Youth League (SSU).

External links
 Helle Klein's weblog (in Swedish)

1966 births
Living people
Swedish journalists
Swedish women writers
Swedish bloggers
Swedish Social Democratic Party politicians
21st-century Swedish Lutheran priests
Swedish people of Hungarian descent
Swedish people of Jewish descent
Writers from Stockholm
Swedish newspaper editors
Women Lutheran clergy
Women newspaper editors
Swedish women bloggers